Furry may refer to:

 Covered with fur
 Furry fandom, a subculture interested in anthropomorphic animal characters with human personalities and characteristics
 Furry, Mississippi, U.S., a place
 Wendell H. Furry (1907–1984), an American physicist
 Furry Lewis (Walter E. Lewis, 1893 or 1899 – 1981), an American country blues guitarist and songwriter

See also

 Furry Creek, British Columbia, a community in Canada